Joanna Bator (born 2 February 1968) is a Polish novelist, journalist, feminist and academic. She specializes in cultural anthropology and gender studies. She is the recipient of the 2013 Nike Award.

Life and career

She was born to Jewish parents in the town of Wałbrzych in Lower Silesia, south-western Poland. She studied cultural studies at the University of Warsaw. She also graduated from School of Social Sciences affiliated with the Polish Academy of Sciences in Warsaw. Her doctoral dissertation concerned the philosophical aspects of the feminist theory and discourse relating to psychoanalysis and postmodernism. In the years 1999–2008 she worked as an assistant professor at the Department of Philosophy and Sociology of the Polish Academy of Sciences. Between 2007–2011 she lectured at the Polish-Japanese Academy of Information Technology. She also took part in a number of scholarships including at the New School for Social Research in New York and Japan Foundation in Tokyo.

She is known for her keen interest in Japanese culture. Bator's first book on Japan was Japoński wachlarz (The Japanese Fan) written after her two-year stay in Japan.

She has written a number of books, both fiction and non-fiction. Her titles such as The Japanese Fan and Sandy Mountain have received wide acclaim in her native Poland. In 2010, she was nominated for Gdynia Literary Prize and Nike Award for her book Sandy Mountain. In 2013, her novel Ciemno, prawie noc (Eng: Dark, Almost Night) won the Nike Award, Poland's leading literary award.

She has also worked as a columnist for Gazeta Wyborcza daily as well as Pani and published articles in such magazines as Tygodnik Powszechny, Twórczość, Bluszcz, Czas kultury and Kultura i społeczeństwo. She has been a member of jury of the Ryszard Kapuściński Award.

In 2014 she was the second Friedrich Dürrenmatt Guest Professor for World Literature at the University of Bern.

Works
 Feminism, Postmodernism, Psychoanalysis (2001)
 A Woman (2002) 
 The Japanese Fan (2004)
 Sandy Mountain (2009)
 Cloudalia (2010)
 Dark, Almost Night (2013)
 A Shark from Yoyogi Park (2014)
 Island Tear (2015)
 Year of the Rabbit (2016)
 Purezento (2017)

See also 
Nike Award
Beata Pawlak Award
Polish literature
List of Polish-language authors

References

1968 births
Living people
21st-century Polish novelists
Polish journalists
Polish women journalists
Polish feminists
People from Wałbrzych
Polish women novelists
21st-century Polish women writers
Nike Award winners